is a Japanese footballer currently playing as a midfielder for Ventforet Kofu.

Career statistics

Club
''Updated to January 1st, 2022.

Notes

Honours

Club
Ventforet Kofu
 Emperor's Cup: 2022

References

External links

1998 births
Living people
Association football people from Saitama Prefecture
Hosei University alumni
Japanese footballers
Japan youth international footballers
Association football midfielders
J2 League players
Ventforet Kofu players